The 2004–05 Heineken Cup was the tenth edition of the Heineken Cup. Competing teams, from England, France, Ireland, Italy, Scotland and Wales, were divided into six pools of four, in which teams played home and away matches against each other. The winners of the pools, together with the two best runners-up, qualified for the knock-out stage. The French club Toulouse won a nail-biting final over fellow French side Stade Français by 18-12 after extra time. Toulouse became the first club to win the event three times.

Format
In the pool matches teams received:
 four points for a win
 two points for a draw
 a bonus point for scoring four or more tries
 a bonus point for losing by seven or fewer points

The teams that qualified for the knockout stage are indicated in bold type on a green background. Their seeds in the knockout stage are indicated next to the team name.

Teams

Pool stage

Pool 1

Pool 2

Pool 3

Pool 4

Pool 5

Pool 6

Seeding and runners-up

Knockout stage

Quarter-finals

Semi-finals

Final

Toulouse became the competition's first three-time champions.

 
2004-05
Heineken
Heineken
Heineken
Heineken
Heineken
Heineken